Demand priority is a media-access method used in 100BaseVG, a 100 megabit per second (Mbit/s) Ethernet implementation proposed by Hewlett-Packard (HP) and AT&T Microelectronics, later standardized as IEEE 802.12. Demand priority shifts network access control from the workstation to a hub. This access method works with a star topology.
In this method, a node that wishes to transmit indicates this wish to the hub and also requests high- or regular-priority service for its transmission. After it obtains permission, the node begins transmitting to the hub.

The hub is responsible for passing the transmission on to the destination node; that is, the hub is responsible for providing access to the network. A hub will pass high priority transmissions through immediately, and will pass regular-priority transmissions through as the opportunity arises.

By letting the hub manage access, the architecture is able to guarantee required bandwidths and requested service priority to particular applications or nodes. It also can guarantee that the network can be scaled up (enlarged) without loss of bandwidth.

Demand priority helps increase bandwidth in the following ways: A node does not need to keep checking whether the network is idle before transmitting. In current Ethernet implementations, a wire pair is dedicated to this task. By making network checking unnecessary, demand priority frees a wire pair. This is fortunate, because the 100BaseVG specifications use quartet signalling, which needs four available wire pairs. Heavy traffic can effectively bring standard Ethernet networks to a standstill, because nodes spend most of their time trying to access the network.

With demand priority, the hub needs to pass a transmission on only to its destination, so that overall network traffic is decreased. This means there is more bandwidth available for heavy
network traffic.

References

Media access control